The 2021 mayoral election in Lansing, Michigan, was held on November 2, 2021 to elect the Mayor of Lansing, Michigan. The primary was be held on August 3, 2021. It had the most crowded field of candidates in any Lansing Election.

Background
One term incumbent Democratic mayor Andy Schor's first term started out relatively smoothly during his first two years as mayor. However, when the 2020 George Floyd protests occurred he started to receive backlash due to his handling of issues of racism within his administration. After deploying tear gas and instituting curfews, some Black Lives Matter activists called on Schor to resign.

Primary election

Candidates

Declared
Andy Schor, incumbent Mayor of Lansing since 2018
Kathie Dunbar, At Large Councilmember of Lansing since 2006
Patricia Spitzley, At Large Councilmember of Lansing since 2016
Farhan Sheikh-Omar, Candidate for Lansing City Council, Ward 1 in 2019
Melissa Huber, Community Psychologist from MSU
Larry James Hutchinson Jr., perennial candidate

Withdrawn
Virg Bernero, former Mayor of Lansing from 2006 to 2018

Results

General election

Candidates
Andy Schor, incumbent Mayor of Lansing since 2018
Kathie Dunbar, At Large Councilmember of Lansing since 2006

Results

References

Lansing
Mayoral elections in Lansing, Michigan
Lansing